Napolitains, sometimes abbreviated as Naps,  are small tablets of chocolate intended to be served with a cup of coffee. They can also be used as promotional goods, with advertising on their wrapping.

Napolitains may be of any type of chocolate.

References

Chocolate